Seisachtheia (from σείειν seiein, to shake, and ἄχθος achthos, burden, i.e. the relief of burdens) was a set of laws instituted by the Athenian lawmaker Solon (c. 638 BC–558 BC) in order to rectify the widespread serfdom and slavery that had run rampant in Athens by the 6th century BCE, by debt relief.

Debt in Athenian society 
Under the pre-existing legal status, according to the account of the Constitution of the Athenians attributed to Aristotle, debtors unable to repay their creditors would surrender their land to them, then becoming hektemoroi, i.e. serfs who cultivated what used to be their own land and gave one sixth of produce to their creditors.  

Should the debt exceed the perceived value of debtor's total assets, then the debtor and his family would become the creditor's slaves as well.  The same would result if a man defaulted on a debt whose collateral was the debtor's personal freedom.

Seisachtheia reforms 
The seisachtheia laws immediately cancelled all outstanding debts, retroactively emancipated all previously enslaved debtors, reinstated all confiscated serf property to the hektemoroi, and forbade the use of personal freedom as collateral in all future debts. The laws instituted a ceiling to maximum property size – regardless of the legality of its acquisition (i.e. by marriage), meant to prevent excessive accumulation of land by powerful families.

See also
 Slavery in ancient Greece
 Jubilee (biblical)

References
 Project Gutenberg's The Great Events by Famous Historians, Vol. 1, Editor: Rossiter Johnson, Charles Horne and John Rudd; Release Date July 24, 2005 [EBook #16352] Copyright, 1905 by The National Alumni – Solon's Early Greek Legislation B.C. 594 by George Grote (See: Location 3949 et. seq.)

Debt bondage
Archaic Athens
Legal codes
Slavery in ancient Greece